Lescheraines (Arpitan: Lècherena) is a commune in the Savoie department in the Auvergne-Rhône-Alpes region in Southeastern France. In 2019, it had a population of 781.

Geography
The village of Lescheraines is located in the northern part of the commune, above the left bank of the Chéran, which forms the commune's northeastern border.

Climate

Lescheraines has a oceanic climate (Köppen climate classification Cfb) closely bordering on a humid continental climate (Dfb).

See also
Communes of the Savoie department

References

Communes of Savoie